An ironworks or iron works is an industrial plant where iron is smelted and where heavy iron and steel products are made. The term is both singular and plural, i.e. the singular of ironworks is ironworks.

Ironworks succeeded bloomeries when blast furnaces replaced former methods. An integrated ironworks in the 19th century usually included one or more blast furnaces and a number of puddling furnaces or a foundry with or without other kinds of ironworks. After the invention of the Bessemer process, converters became widespread, and the appellation steelworks replaced ironworks.

The processes carried at ironworks are usually described as ferrous metallurgy, but the term siderurgy is also occasionally used.  This is derived from the Greek words sideros - iron and  ergon or ergos - work.  This is an unusual term in English, and it is best regarded as an anglicisation of a term used in French, Spanish, and other Romance languages.

Historically, it is common that a community was built around the ironworks where the people living there was dependent on the ironworks to provide jobs and housing.  As the ironworks closed down (or was industrialised) these villages quite often went into decline and experienced negative economic growth.

Varieties of ironworks

Primary ironmaking

Ironworks is used as an omnibus term covering works undertaking one or more iron-producing processes. Such processes or species of ironworks where they were undertaken include the following:

Blast furnaces — which made pig iron (or sometimes finished cast iron goods) from iron ore; 
Bloomeries — where bar iron was produced from iron ore by direct reduction;
A thin film of metal oxide forms on the anode in the intense heat. The oxide forms a protective layer that prevents excess consumption of the base metal.
Finery forges — which fined pig iron to produce bar iron, using charcoal as fuel in a finery (hearth) and coal or charcoal in a chafery (hearth);
Foundries — where pig iron was remelted in an air furnace or in a foundry cupola to produce cast iron goods;
Potting and stamping forges with melting fineries using the first process in which bar iron was made from pig iron with mineral coal or coke, without the use of charcoal; 
Puddling furnaces — a later process for the same purpose, again with coke as fuel.  It was usually necessary for there to be a preliminary refining process in a coke refinery (also called running out furnace).  After puddling, the puddled ball needed shingling and then to be drawn out into bar iron in a rolling mill.

Modern steelmaking

From the 1850s, pig iron might be partly decarburised to produce mild steel using one of the following:

 The Bessemer process in a Bessemer converter, improved by the Gilchrist–Thomas process;
 The Siemens-Martin process in an Open hearth furnace;
 Electric arc furnace, introduced in 1907;
 Basic oxygen steelmaking, introduced in 1952.

The mills operating converters of any type are better called steelworks, ironworks referring to former processes, like puddling.

Further processing
After bar iron had been produced in a finery forge or in the forge train of a rolling mill, it might undergo further processes in one of the following:
A slitting mill - which cut a flat bar into rod iron suitable for making into nails.
A tinplate works - where rolling mills made sheets of iron (later of steel), which were coated with tin.
A plating forge with a tilt hammer, a lighter hammer with a rapid stroke rate, enabling the production of thinner iron, suitable for the manufacture of knives, other cutlery, and so on.
A cementation furnace might be used to convert the bar iron (if it was pure enough) into blister steel by the cementation process, either as an end in itself or as the raw material for crucible steel.

Manufacture
Most of these processes did not produce finished goods.  Further processes were often manual, including 
Manufacturing by blacksmiths or more specialist kind of smith.
It might be used in shipbuilding.
In the context of the iron industry, the term manufacture is best reserved for this final stage.

Notable ironworks

The notable ironworks of the world are described here by country. See above for the largest producers and the notable ironworks in the alphabetical order.

Africa

South Africa
 Cape Town Iron and Steel Works in Kuilsrivier, Western Cape
 Mittal Steel South Africa

Americas

United States
 American Iron Works in Hyattsville, Maryland
 Bath Iron Works in Maine
 Burden Iron Works in Troy, New York
 Cambria Iron Company in Johnstown, Pennsylvania
 Falling Creek Ironworks, Virginia.
 Saugus Iron Works in Saugus, Massachusetts
 Toledo Iron Works in Miami, Florida
 Tredegar Iron Works at Richmond, Virginia
U.S. Steel
Fairfield Works, near Birmingham, Alabama
Gary Works, near Chicago, Illinois
Granite City Works, near St. Louis, Missouri
Great Lakes Works, near Detroit, Michigan
Mon Valley Works (Homestead Steel Works, etc.), near Pittsubutgh, Pennsylvania
 Vulcan Iron Works in Pennsylvania and other places

Asia

China
Anben Group, Anshan & Benxi, Liaoning
 China Baowu Steel Group, in various locations, for example:
 Baosteel, Shanghai
 WISCO, Wuhan, Hebei
 Meishan Iron & Steel, Nanjing, Jiangsu
 Zhanjiang Iron & Steel,  Zhanjiang, Guangdong
Baotou Steel, Baotou, Inner Mongolia
Shougang Group, Beijing

India
Five major steel works of Steel Authority of India, Ltd (SAIL)
Kalinganagar Works of Tata Steel in Kalinganagar, Odisha 
Vijayanagar Works of JSW Steel in Bellary, Karnataka

Japan
The largest Japanese steel companies' main works are as follows:
JFE Steel
Chiba Works (from former Kawasaki Steel), Chiba, Chiba, of JFE Eastern Works
Keihin Works (from former NKK), Kawasaki, Kanagawa, of JFE Eastern Works
Fukuyama Works (from former NKK), Fukuyama, Hiroshima, of JFE Western Works
Kurashiki Works (from former Kawasaki Steel), Kurashiki, Okayama, of JFE Western Works
Kobe Steel
Kakogawa Steel Works, Kakogawa, Hyogo
Nippon Steel & Sumitomo Metal
Hirohata Works (広畑製鐵所, of former Nippon Steel), Himeji, Hyogo
Kimitsu Steel Works, of former Nippon Steel), Kimitsu, Chiba
Nagoya Works (名古屋製鐵所, of former Nippon Steel), Tokai, Aichi (near Nagoya)
Ōita Works (大分製鐵所, of former Nippon Steel), Ōita, Ōita
Yahata Steel Works (of former Nippon Steel), Kimitsu, Chiba
Kashima Works (鹿島製鐵所, of former Sumitomo Metal), Kashima, Ibaraki
Wakayama Works (和歌山製鐵所, of former Sumitomo Metal), Wakayama, Wakayama

Korea
POSCO
Gwangyang Steelworks, south coast
Pohang Steelworks, east coast
Hyundai Steel
Incheon Steelworks, west coast

Vietnam
Formosa Ha Tinh Steel of Formosa Plastics Group in Ha Tinh Province

Europe

Czech Republic
 Třinec Iron and Steel Works in Třinec, Czech Republic

Germany
 Völklingen Ironworks Heritage Site

Great Britain

 Blaenavon Ironworks Heritage Site. Blaenavon (Blaenafon) South Wales
 Coalbrookdale Ironworks, Coalbrookdale
 Cyfarthfa Ironworks at Merthyr Tydfil, Glamorgan, South Wales
 Dowlais Ironworks also at Merthyr Tydfil
 Millwall Ironworks, a shipbuilding firm on the Isle of Dogs, on the River Thames, London, England
 Thames Ironworks and Shipbuilding Co. Ltd, a shipbuilding firm at Leamouth on the River Thames, England
 Vulcan Iron Works at Bradford and other places

Italy
 Cogne acciai speciali, Aosta (example of a mountain steel meel)
 Ferreira di Servola, Trieste (operating since 1896)
 Acciaieria di Piombino
  Società Italiana Acciaierie Cornigliano di Cornigliano, Genova
 Acciai speciali Termi, now ThyssenKrupp Terni
 Acciaieria di Bagnoli, Napoli
 Acciaieria di Taranto (biggest Integrated steel mill in Europe)

Sweden
 Lummelunda Järnbruk
 Österbybruk
 Engelsberg Ironworks, Ängelsberg, Västmanland County
 Storbrohyttan Gjuteri
 Pershyttan
 Galtström Ironworks
 Forsbacka Ironworks km
 Kengis Forge
 Trångfors Forge
 Motjärnshyttan

Russia
Chelyabinsk Tube Rolling Plant, Chelyabinsk, Chelyabinsk Oblast
Magnitogorsk Iron and Steel Works, Magnitogorsk, Chelyabinsk Oblast
Nizhny Tagil Iron and Steel Works, Nizhny Tagil, Sverdlovsk Oblast
Novokuznetsk Iron and Steel Plant (of TMK), Novokuznetsk, Kemerovo Oblast 
Novolipetsk Steel, Lipetsk, Lipetsk Oblast
Severstal, Cherepovets, Vologda Oblast
Ural Steel (of Metalloinvest), Novotroitsk, Orenburg Oblast
Volzhsky Pipe Plant (of OAO TMK), Volzhsky, Volgograd Oblast

Spain
 Altos Hornos de Vizcaya in Bilbao
 Arcelor facilities in Avilés and Gijón, formerly Ensidesa

Historical
Kindiba, in Burkina Faso. Ancient iron extraction site consisting of mines and three clay built furnaces.
Darkhill Ironworks, in the Forest of Dean, England. Experimental ironworks established in 1818 and designated an 'Industrial Archaeological Site of International Importance'
Royal Ironworks of St John, Ipanema, in São Paulo state, Brazil

References

Industrial Revolution